L6 may refer to:

 L6, a variety of low-alloy special purpose steel
 Mauritania Airlines International (IATA code: L6, ICAO code: MAI)
 Straight-6 engine
 L6, Bell Telephone Laboratories' Low-Level Linked List Language
 L6, instance of mathematical Lp space
 L 6 (keelboat), class of sailboat
 ISO/IEC 8859-10 (Latin-6), an 8-bit character encoding
 Lower sixth (grade 12) in British secondary education

Products by model number 
 Gibson L6-S guitar
 Motorola SLVR L6 phone
 PRR L6 locomotives
 L6 Wombat firearm
Aircraft:
 Daimler D.I fighter 
 Interstate Cadet L-6A light passenger plane
 Lucas L6, French light aircraft

See also
6L (disambiguation)